John Legat Bain BEM (1923–2019) was a Scottish football player, manager and chairman for Ferranti Thistle and Meadowbank Thistle (the predecessor clubs of Livingston).

Club career
Bain left the Royal Navy in 1952 to become a planning engineer with high-tech firm Ferranti in his home city of Edinburgh.

He joined the company’s football team Ferranti Thistle and starred as a left-back. He played until he was 40, and was convinced to take over as manager.

He then became chairman for 15 years before being convinced to step back in as manager when the club was renamed Meadowbank Thistle and joined the Scottish Football League in 1974.

Bain remained involved with the team, which changed its name in 1995 to accompany a relocation to Almondvale Stadium in Livingston, West Lothian, as the team’s honorary vice-president.

Personal life and death
After retirement in 1980, Bain was awarded a British Empire Medal for his involvement in Scottish football. He died in Livingston in 2019, at the age of 95.

Honours
Ferranti Thistle
Scottish Qualifying Cup: 1962–63

References

1923 births
Date of birth missing
2019 deaths
Date of death missing
Scottish footballers
Footballers from Edinburgh
Association football defenders
Livingston F.C. players
Scottish football managers 
Livingston F.C. managers
Scottish Football League managers
Portsmouth F.C. players
Reading F.C. players
Recipients of the British Empire Medal